Elmer is a city in Macon County, Missouri, United States. The population was 51 at the 2020 census.

History
Elmer had its start in 1888 when the Atchison, Topeka and Santa Fe Railway was extended to that point.

A post office called Elmer has been in operation since 1889. On July 26, 2011 the United States Postal Service announced plans to permanently close the Elmer post office as part of a nationwide restructuring plan.

Geography
Elmer is located at  (39.956820, -92.649255).

Demographics

2010 census
As of the census of 2010, there were 80 people, 36 households, and 23 families living in the city. The racial makeup of the city was 97.5% White and 2.5% from two or more races. Hispanic or Latino of any race were 2.5% of the population.

There were 36 households, of which 22.2% had children under the age of 18 living with them, 52.8% were married couples living together, 5.6% had a female householder with no husband present, 5.6% had a male householder with no wife present, and 36.1% were non-families. 30.6% of all households were made up of individuals, and 13.9% had someone living alone who was 65 years of age or older. The average household size was 2.22 and the average family size was 2.78.

The median age in the city was 51.6 years. 22.5% of residents were under the age of 18; 1.3% were between the ages of 18 and 24; 15.1% were from 25 to 44; 33.8% were from 45 to 64; and 27.5% were 65 years of age or older. The gender makeup of the city was 51.3% male and 48.8% female.

2000 census
As of the census of 2000, there were 98 people, 46 households, and 27 families living in the city. The population density was 402.0 people per square mile (157.7/km2). There were 55 housing units at an average density of 225.6/sq mi (88.5/km2). The racial makeup of the city was 100.00% White.

There were 46 households, out of which 26.1% had children under the age of 18 living with them, 43.5% were married couples living together, 13.0% had a female householder with no husband present, and 41.3% were non-families. 37.0% of all households were made up of individuals, and 13.0% had someone living alone who was 65 years of age or older. The average household size was 2.13 and the average family size was 2.74.

In the city the population was spread out, with 23.5% under the age of 18, 6.1% from 18 to 24, 25.5% from 25 to 44, 28.6% from 45 to 64, and 16.3% who were 65 years of age or older. The median age was 43 years. For every 100 females there were 92.2 males. For every 100 females age 18 and over, there were 92.3 males.

The median income for a household in the city was $16,250, and the median income for a family was $30,750. Males had a median income of $18,125 versus $15,972 for females. The per capita income for the city was $9,834. There were 11.8% of families and 29.5% of the population living below the poverty line, including 40.0% of under eighteens and 13.3% of those over 64.

References

External links
  Elmer, Missouri Early History

Cities in Macon County, Missouri
Cities in Missouri